Daham Miro (Arabic: دهام ميرو) (January 1921-November 2010) was a Kurdish political leader and former chairman of the Kurdistan Democratic Party of Syria (KDPS). Daham Miro was born in Sêgirka Mîro ("Miro’s three hills") in Syria.

He followed a Quranic School in Ayn Diwar in the thirties. He and his family supported the first Kurdish party in Syria (Kurdish Democratic Party established in 1957) and opposed the Syrian policy against the Kurds. As a result, his family was heavily punished, and a great part of their land was given to Arab settlers brought into the region as a part of the Baathist Arabisation policy of the Kurdish region.

KDPS went through several divisions in the sixties. Mustafa Barzani (The father of Massoud Barzani the current president of Iraqi Kurdistan) attempted to reunify the party by inviting all the fractions in 1970 to Iraqi Kurdistan. During the meetings Miro was chosen and later re-elected in 1972 as the chairman of KDPS.

Miro and other party leaders were arrested in the summer of 1973 shortly after they had addressed a memorandum to the Syrian president Assad protesting the living conditions of the Kurds whose citizenship papers had been confiscated. Miro and other party leaders suffered from torture during detention. In 1976 Amnesty international launched a campaign urging the Syrian government to release Miro. Despite the outcry of Amnesty International, Miro was only released in 1981, after eight years of imprisonment.

Despite his political inactivity after his release, Miro still held enormous respect among Syrian Kurds.

References
Syria's Kurds by Jordi Tejel
A People without a country by Gérard Chaliand
Amnesty International 8/1976: Daham Miro (Campaign for Prisoners of the Month)

1921 births
2010 deaths
Syrian Kurdish politicians
Kurdish nationalists